Kelly-Eve Koopman, is a South African director and actor. She is best known for the roles in the television serials Hollywood in my Huis and Kroto and Mayfair. She is one of three directors of FEMME projects.

Career
Apart from acting, she is also a community leader and social activist. She is also the co-creator of the platform 'Coloured Mentality' which has become a unique interactive storytelling space for coloured community. Over the past three years she has served 4000 young women in 20 disenfranchised schools in the Western Cape. In 2017, she released a six-part web documentary along with filmmaker Sarah Summers. The documentary focuses on the coloured racial identity in South Africa.

In 2018, she appeared in the South African Indian action crime film Mayfair. She played the supportive role of 'Ameena' in the film, which later received positive reviews. The film was also screened at the 62nd BFI London Film Festival and Africa in Motion Film Festival in October 2018.

Along with Kim Windvogel, she compiled the book They Called me Queer. In 2019, she became an author, where he wrote the Memoir Because I Couldn't Kill You.

Filmography

References

External links
 

Living people
South African film directors
South African film actresses
South African television actresses
People from Durban
South African television directors
Year of birth missing (living people)